Euchaetes bolteri is a species of moth in the family Erebidae. It was described by Richard Harper Stretch in 1885. It is found from the south-western US (Texas and New Mexico) to Mexico and Costa Rica.

Adults have been recorded on wing from late March to May.

References

 Arctiidae genus list at Butterflies and Moths of the World of the Natural History Museum

Phaegopterina
Moths described in 1885